Tomislav Sivić (born 29 August 1966) is a Serbian football manager and former player.

Playing career
Between 1988 and 1990, Sivić spent two seasons with Bačka Subotica in the Vojvodina League, the fourth tier of Yugoslav football. He would later play for Spartak Subotica during the 1992–93 First League of FR Yugoslavia.

In 1995, Sivić played for HK in Iceland. He subsequently moved to the Faroe Islands, serving as player-manager for several clubs.

Managerial career
In January 2005, Sivić was appointed as manager of Smederevo. He resigned from his position in early November after three consecutive losses. In June 2006, Sivić took charge of Voždovac, but left the club after just two months due to poor results early in the season.

On 31 July 2015, Sivić was named as manager of the Serbia under-21s. He managed to qualify the team for the 2017 UEFA European Under-21 Championship via the play-offs. However, on 26 December 2016, it was announced that Sivić left his position due to "private reasons", only to take over as manager of Hungarian club Mezőkövesd the following day.

Personal life
Sivić was born to a Bunjevac father and a Hungarian mother in Subotica, SFR Yugoslavia (in present-day Serbia). He obtained Hungarian citizenship in 2012.

Honours
Kecskemét
 Nemzeti Bajnokság II: 2007–08
 Magyar Kupa: 2010–11
Diósgyőr
 Ligakupa: 2013–14

References

External links
 
 

1966 births
Living people
Sportspeople from Subotica
Serbian people of Croatian descent
Serbian people of Hungarian descent
Yugoslav footballers
Serbia and Montenegro footballers
Serbian footballers
Association football midfielders
FK Bačka 1901 players
FK Spartak Subotica players
Handknattleiksfélag Kópavogs players
VB Vágur players
B36 Tórshavn players
KÍ Klaksvík players
First League of Serbia and Montenegro players
Faroe Islands Premier League players
Serbia and Montenegro expatriate footballers
Expatriate footballers in Iceland
Expatriate footballers in the Faroe Islands
Serbian football managers
B36 Tórshavn managers
KÍ Klaksvík managers
FK Smederevo managers
FK Voždovac managers
FK Spartak Subotica managers
Kecskeméti TE managers
Serbia national under-21 football team managers
FK Hajduk Kula managers
Paksi FC managers
Diósgyőri VTK managers
Mezőkövesdi SE managers
FK Novi Pazar managers
FK Radnički Niš managers
Serbian SuperLiga managers
Nemzeti Bajnokság I managers
Serbia and Montenegro expatriate football managers
Serbian expatriate football managers
Expatriate football managers in Iceland
Expatriate football managers in the Faroe Islands
Expatriate football managers in Hungary
Serbian expatriate sportspeople in Hungary